Downie Peak is a  mountain summit located in British Columbia, Canada.

Description

Although prominently visible from nearly every peak in the Northern Selkirks, Downie Peak is more notable for its steep rise above local terrain than for its absolute elevation. Precipitation runoff from the mountain drains south to Downie Creek and north to the Goldstream River, both of which empty into Lake Revelstoke which is a reservoir of the Columbia River.

History
The peak was named by Walter Moberly after William Downie (1819–1893), a gold prospector employed by Sir James Douglas. It was labelled on a 1915 reconnaissance map of the Northern Selkirk Mountains; prior to then it was labelled "Eldorado Peak" on earlier maps. The mountain's toponym was officially adopted March 31, 1924, by the Geographical Names Board of Canada.

The first ascent of the summit was made July 14, 1959, by William L. Putnam, W. V. Graham Matthews and David Michael via the southwest ridge. The second successful ascent wasn't accomplished until 1991.

Climate

Based on the Köppen climate classification, Downie Peak is located in a subarctic climate zone with cold, snowy winters, and mild summers. Winter temperatures can drop below −20 °C with wind chill factors below −30 °C.

See also
Big Bend Country
Big Bend Gold Rush
Geography of British Columbia
Downieville, California

References

External links
 Downie Peak: Weather forecast
 Downie Peak (photo): PBase
 Downie Peak (photo): Google.com/books

Two-thousanders of British Columbia
Selkirk Mountains
Columbia Country
Kootenay Land District